TheCallander Jazz and Blues Festival is a music festival held in the town of Callander in Loch Lomond and the Trossachs National Park, Scotland. It was first held in 2006. The event in 2019 featured 54 gigs at 14 venues, performing live jazz and blues over 3 days.

Lineups

2009: 2–4 October
Invited musicians for the 2009 Festival include:
Jazz
Fat Sams Band, Aidrian Drovers Slide Rule
Winstons's Pennine Jazz,
The Tim Barella Big Band,
Brass Impact,
The George Penman Jazzmen,
 Havana Swing,
Swing Guitars,
Kit Carey's Jazz Band,
 The Trossachs Big Band,
The Roger Cull Quartet,
Jazzmain,
The Maria Speight Quintet,
Jan Douglas and Primetime,
Moodswing,
The Scott Madden Trio,
The Jess Abrams Quartet,
The Bobby Wishart Quintet
McCallum/Harrison Duo,
The Thistle Saxophone Quartet , 
The Frank Curran Quartet,
McLaren High School Swing Band,
South Ayrshire Schools Jazz Band,
The Bert Craig Trio,
Quatro Mc Jazz,
The Rosie Blue Duo

Blues
The Lyndon Anderson Band,
Side Winder,
The Revolutionaires,
The Red Stripe Band,
The Blues Devils,
The Blues Juniors,
The Bob Hall Show,
B' and The Honey Boys,
Mojo Rising,
Main Street Blues,
The Cherry Lee Mewis Band,
The Sourmash Blues Band,
Safe House Blues,
The Rosie Blue Blues Band,
Gavin Mooney,
Al Hughes,
Minnie and The Victors

2008: 3–5 October
The 2008 event featured nearly 50 bands and solo performers.
Big Band
Trossachs Big Band (  composed of local musicians and member of  That Swing Sensation ), McLaren High School Swing Band, Brass Impact, Andy Mears Jazz Orchestra, The Tim Barella Big Band
Trad
George Penman Jazzmen, Kit Carey's Jazzband, Winston's Pennine Jazz
Jazz: Duos to Sextets
Alison Burns Quartet, Birdland, Bobby Wishart Quintet, Claire Daly Trio, Dekal,  Havana Swing, Jan Douglas & Prime Time, Liquid Jazz, Liz MacEwan & Jack Finlay Trio, Lorna Reid Quartet, Maria Speight Quintet, McCallum/Harrison Duo, Moodswing, Nick Gould's Jazzmain, Roger Cull Quartet, The Clyde Rhythm Group, The Frank Curran Quartet, The Jess Abrams Quartet, The Thistle Saxophone Quartet 
Blues
Al Hughes, Blue Dubh, Bluebelly, Blues Devils, Blues House, Daniel Smith & T-Bone Taylor, Deep Blue, Gavin Mooney, Georgia Crawl, Guy Tortora Band, Kent Duchaine, Lights Out by Nine, Main Street Blues, Papa Mojo, The Blues Collective, The Fabulous Corvettes, The Hitmen, Wing and a Prayer

See also

List of blues festivals 
List of jazz festivals

References

External links 

Music festivals established in 2006
Music festivals in Scotland
Jazz festivals in the United Kingdom
Blues festivals in the United Kingdom
Folk festivals in the United Kingdom
Music in Stirling (council area)
2006 establishments in Scotland
Callander